Robert van Voren (publishing pseudonym of Johannes Baks, born 25 July 1959, Montreal, Quebec, Canada) is a Dutch human rights activist, sovietologist and historian.

He is a professor of Soviet and post-Soviet studies in the Ilia State University in Tbilisi (Georgia) and in the Vytautas Magnus University in Kaunas (Lithuania) as well as Chief Executive of the international foundation Human Rights in Mental Health-Federation Global Initiative on Psychiatry and Executive Director of the Andrei Sakharov Research Center for Democratic Development at Vytautas Magnus University in Kaunas, Lithuania.

Biography 
He was born on 7 July 1959, Montreal, Quebec, Canada and graduated from Amsterdam University in 1986. In the 1980s, he worked at the Bukovsky Foundation based in Amsterdam and since 1989 was the director of its successor, the Second World Center. Since 1980, he had regularly visited the Soviet Union including Ukraine and collected information on repression of dissidents, as well as smuggling Samizdat publications to the west. In 1986, he became Chief Executive of the Global Initiative on Psychiatry. He is also a Honorary Fellow of the British Royal College of Psychiatrists and Honorary Member of the Ukrainian Psychiatric Association.  In 2005, he was knighted by Queen Beatrix of the Netherlands for his work as a human rights activist. He has a Lithuanian citizenship since 11 February 2003 and lives in Vilnius.

Robert van Voren has published over a dozen books. His works cover political abuse of psychiatry in the Soviet Union and China and reforms of mental health in Eastern Europe, the former Soviet Union, Ukraine, Georgia. Robert van Voren's contribution to reform of forensic psychiatry in states of the former Soviet Union is widely recognized. Van Voren also published widely on the theme of the Holocaust in Lithuania.

In 2015, he commented the Russo-Ukrainian War and the Russian military intervention in the Syrian Civil War. Van Voren wrote about his disappointment with the results of the Dutch referendum on the Ukraine–European Union Association Agreement.

References

Sources

Books 
 
 
 
 
 
 
 
 
 
 

1959 births
Living people
Writers from Montreal
Canadian people of Dutch descent
Canadian emigrants to the Netherlands
University of Amsterdam alumni
Global Initiative on Psychiatry
Fellows of the Royal College of Psychiatrists
Psychiatry academics
Reformers
Dutch political scientists
Dutch political writers
Dutch medical writers
Dutch non-fiction writers
Dutch male writers
Writers about Russia
Writers about the Soviet Union
20th-century Dutch writers
21st-century Dutch writers
Dutch political activists
Dutch human rights activists
Soviet psychiatric abuse whistleblowers
Academic staff of Vytautas Magnus University
Academic staff of Ilia State University
Russian studies scholars
Knights of the Order of Orange-Nassau
20th-century Canadian male writers
Male non-fiction writers
20th-century pseudonymous writers
21st-century pseudonymous writers